William Edward George Bassett (8 June 1912 – 1977) was a Welsh professional footballer. During his career, he made over 200 appearances in the Football League in spells with Cardiff City and Crystal Palace.

Career
Bassett began his career at Aberaman Athletic before moving on to Wolverhampton Wanderers in 1933. He only spent a single season at Wolves, without making a first-team appearance, before returning to Wales and signing for manager Ben Watts-Jones at Cardiff City. He made his debut on the opening day of the 1934–35 season during a 2–1 victory over Charlton Athletic and was a virtual ever-present in his four years, scoring two goals for the Bluebirds, against Bournemouth & Boscombe Athletic and Bristol City.

He joined Crystal Palace in 1938 but the outbreak of World War II interrupted his spell at the London side and he served in the Welsh Guards during the hostilities. He finished his league career after three years with the club and took over as player-manager of Porthmadog.

References

1912 births
1977 deaths
Welsh footballers
British Army personnel of World War II
Welsh Guards soldiers
Wolverhampton Wanderers F.C. players
Cardiff City F.C. players
Crystal Palace F.C. players
Porthmadog F.C. players
English Football League players
Aberaman Athletic F.C. players
Date of death missing
Association football central defenders